Odete Cipriano Serpa, better known as Yara Cortes (September 22, 1921 – October 17, 2002) was a Brazilian actress.

References

External links 

Brazilian telenovela actresses
Actresses from Rio de Janeiro (city)
Brazilian television actresses
Brazilian film actresses
Brazilian stage actresses
1921 births
2002 deaths